Robert Brown may refer to:

Entertainers and artists 
 Washboard Sam or Robert Brown (1910–1966), American musician and singer
 Robert W. Brown (1917–2009), American printmaker and glass artist
 Robert Brown (British actor) (1921–2003), British actor, played M in four James Bond films
 Robert Brown (American actor) (1926–2022), American actor, played Jason Bolt in Here Come the Brides
 Robert Delford Brown (1930–2009), American performance artist
 Robert Brown (cartoonist) (1936–2007), American painter and cartoonist
 Robert Latham Brown (born 1947), American producer, production manager, and author
 Robert Curtis Brown (born 1957), American actor
 Robert Brown (musician) (born 1970), lead singer of steampunk band Abney Park
 Robert Brown (North Carolina musician) (born 1983), multi-instrumentalist of his solo project Epignosis
 Reb Brown (Robert Edward Brown, born 1948), American actor

Military 
 Robert Brown (sailor) (fl. 1830–1864), American Civil War sailor and Medal of Honor recipient
 Robert B. Brown (1844–1916), American soldier and Medal of Honor recipient
 Robert Brooks Brown (born 1959), U.S. Army officer

Politicians 
 Robert Brown (MP for Gloucester), Member of Parliament (MP) for Gloucester in 1353 and 1358
 Robert Weare alias Brown, MP for Marlborough in 1553
 Sir Robert Brown, 1st Baronet, of Westminster (died 1760), British Member of Parliament
 Robert Brown (Pennsylvania politician) (1744–1823), U.S. congressman from Pennsylvania
 Robert Brown (English politician) (1921–1996)
 Robert Brown (Ohio politician) (1928–1985), member of the Ohio House of Representatives from 1979 to 1985
 Bob Brown (Australian Labor politician) (born 1933)
 Robert Brown (Minnesota politician) (1935–2020), member of the Minnesota State Senate
 Bob Brown (born 1944), Australian Greens senator 
 Robert Brown (Scottish politician) (born 1947)
 Robert Brown (Georgia politician) (1950–2011), Democratic member of the Georgia State Senate
 Robert Brown (South Carolina politician) (born 1950), member of the South Carolina House of Representatives
 Robert Leslie Brown (born c. 1951), Australian politician since 2006

Scientists and academics 
 Robert Brown (botanist, born 1773) (1773–1858), Scottish (Montrose) scientist, explorer, author, botanist: R.Br., after whom Brownian motion is named
 Robert Brown (New Zealand botanist) (c. 1824–1906), New Zealand bootmaker and botanist: R.Br.bis
 Robert Brown (botanist, born 1842) (1842–1895), Scottish (Caithness) explorer, scientist, author, botanist: R.Br.ter
 Robert Cunyngham Brown (1867–1945), British psychologist and medical administrator
 Robert Rudmose-Brown (1879–1957), British academic botanist and polar explorer
 Robert Brown (plant physiologist) (1908–1999), British scientist, Fellow of the Royal Society
 Robert Hanbury Brown (1916–2002), British astronomer and physicist
 Robert Goodell Brown (1923–2013), American statistician
 Robert E. Brown (1927–2005), American ethnomusicologist, coined the term "world music"
 Robert A. Brown (born 1951), President of Boston University
 J. Robert Brown Jr., American law professor

Sportspeople

American football
 R. R. Brown (1879–1950), American football coach
 Robert J. Brown (1904–1985), American football player, businessman and author
 Robert Brown (American football, born 1943), American football player
 Robert Brown (American football, born 1960), American football defensive end

Association football (soccer)
 Robert Brown (footballer, born 1856) (1856–1904), Scottish footballer, played for Scotland in 1884, nicknamed 'Sparrow'
 Robert Brown (footballer, born 1860) (1860–1940), Scottish footballer, played for Scotland in 1885, nicknamed 'Plumber'
 Robert Brown (football manager) (fl. 1911–1935), English football manager
 Robert George Brown (fl. 1920s), English footballer
 Sailor Brown (Robert Albert John Brown, 1915–2008), English footballer

Other sports
 Robert Brown (New Zealand cricketer) (1850–1934)
 Robert Brown (baseball) (fl. 1874), American baseball player
 Robert Brown (sport shooter) (1873–1918), British Olympic shooter
 Robert Paul Brown (1876–1962), American baseball player, manager, and team owner
 Red Brown (basketball) (1907–1992), American college basketball coach, athletic director
 Robert Brown (American racing driver), NASCAR Cup Series driver in the 1974 Winston 500
 Robert Brown (South African cricketer) (born 1957)
 Dale Brown (boxer) or Robert Dale Brown (born 1971), Canadian boxer
 Robert Brown, English racing driver in the 2008 Formula Palmer Audi season

Other people 
 Robert Brown (agriculturalist) (1757–1831), Scottish rural and agricultural writer
 Robert Brown (trade unionist) (1848–1917), Scottish trade union leader
 Robert Allan Brown (1849–1931), Canadian-American prospector and mining promoter
 Robert G. Brown (c. 1870–1920), American inventor of the telephone handset
 Robert Brown (prelate) (1877–1947), Roman Catholic prelate, Apostolic Prefect of Zambesi
 R. Lewis Brown (1892–1948), U.S. federal judge
 Robert R. Brown (bishop) (1910–1994), author and Episcopal bishop of Arkansas
 Robert Brown (archdeacon of Bedford) (1914–2001), Anglican Archdeacon of Bedford
 Robert Brown (archdeacon of Killala), Anglican priest in Ireland
 Robert James Brown (moderator), Scottish minister
 Robert McAfee Brown (1920–2001), American Protestant theologian and peace activist
 Bob Brown (newspaper publisher) (Robert Lloyd Brown, 1930–1984), Las Vegas newspaper editor and publisher
 Robert K. Brown (born 1932), American combat correspondent and investigative journalist
 Robert L. Brown (Arkansas judge) (born 1941), Associate Justice of the Arkansas Supreme Court
 Robert Brown (born 1957), Scottish man wrongly convicted of murder in the Robert Brown case in 1977
 Robert M. Brown, 1978 recipient of the Railroader of the Year award
 Robert C. Brown, American engineer
 Robert Brown (solicitor) (1844–1912), British solicitor and classical philologist

See also 
 Bert Brown (disambiguation)
 Bob Brown (disambiguation)
 Bobby Brown (disambiguation)
 Rob Brown (disambiguation)
 Robby Brown (disambiguation)
 Robert Browne (disambiguation)